The central peninsular alligator lizard (Elgaria velazquezi) is a species of medium-sized lizard in the family Anguidae. The species is endemic to Mexico.

References

Elgaria
Reptiles of Mexico
Reptiles described in 2001
Taxa named by Larry Lee Grismer